Primrose Bogatsu is a South African politician who has been a member of the North West Provincial Legislature since February 2023, representing the Economic Freedom Fighters. Bogatsu was elected the deputy provincial chairperson of the EFF at the party's third Provincial People's Assembly in September 2022.

References

Living people
Year of birth missing (living people)
Tswana people
Economic Freedom Fighters politicians
Members of the North West Provincial Legislature
Women members of provincial legislatures of South Africa